Prince Nicholas may refer to: 

Nicholas Henri, Duke of Orléans (1607–1611), the second son and fourth child of Henry IV of France
Prince Nicholas of Greece and Denmark (1872–1938), fourth child and third son of George I of Greece
Prince Nicholas of Romania (1903–1978), second son of King Ferdinand I of Romania
Prince Nikola of Yugoslavia (1928–1954), the younger son of Prince Paul of Yugoslavia 
Prince Nikolaos of Greece and Denmark (born 1969), the second son and third child of Constantine II, formerly of Greece
Nicholas, Crown Prince of Montenegro (born 1944), pretender to the throne of Montenegro
Prince Nicolas, Duke of Ångermanland (born 2015), son of Princess Madeleine of Sweden

For Russian imperial princes named Nicholas, see:
Nicholas Romanov (disambiguation)